Jack Kelly (rower) may refer to:
 Jack Kelly Sr. (rower)
 Jack Kelly Jr. (rower)